The 2007 Arun District Council election took place on 3 May 2007 to elect members of Arun District Council in West Sussex, England. The whole council was up for election and the Conservative Party stayed in overall control of the council.

Election result

|}

3 Conservative candidates were unopposed.

Ward results

External links
2007 Arun election result

2007 English local elections
2007
2000s in West Sussex